Wilson v United Kingdom [2002] ECHR 552 is a United Kingdom labour law and European labour law case concerning discrimination by employers against their workers who join and take action through trade unions. After a long series of appeals through the UK court system, the European Court of Human Rights held that ECHR article 11 protects the fundamental right of people to join a trade union, engage in union related activities and take action as a last resort to protect their interests.

Facts
Mr Wilson worked for the Daily Mail newspaper. The paper derecognised the National Union of Journalists. Pay was increased for workers who took individual contracts, instead of staying on terms negotiated through collective agreement. Mr Wilson chose not to shift to an individual contract. His salary was not increased as quickly as those of the rest of his colleagues.

Mr Palmer worked for the ports in Southampton. His employer offered him an individual contract, coupled with a 10% pay increase, but on the condition that he would cease to be represented by the union, the National Union of Rail, Maritime and Transport Workers. Mr Palmer refused to move to an individual contract. Unlike that of the other workers, his pay was increased by 8.9%, and he did not benefit as others did from a private medical insurance plan. The company then derecognised the union.

Both parties, together with their union, complained that their right to take part in trade union activities was violated under UK law, and if not that UK law, in particular under the Trade Union and Labour Relations (Consolidation) Act 1992 section 148(3) failed to comply with international standards, and the European Convention on Human Rights article 11.

Judgment

Court of Appeal
In the Court of Appeal Dillon LJ, Butler-Sloss LJ and Farquharson LJ held that the employers' conduct had infringed the then-effective Employment Protection (Consolidation) Act 1978 s 23. The employers' action was intended to deter employees from being trade union members and such deterrence was a wholly foreseeable consequence.

House of Lords
In the House of Lords, Lord Keith, Lord Bridge, Lord Browne-Wilkinson, Lord Slynn and Lord Lloyd overturned the Court of Appeal. They held that employers withholding a pay rise from employees was not "action short of dismissal". It was an omission, and should be interpreted as such given the complex legislative history of the provision. Moreover, the Tribunal had never established that the employers' purpose was to deter its employees from joining a union or penalising them from membership. So the legislation here did not protect Wilson or Palmer's activities.

Nicholas Underhill QC and Brian Napier acted for Associated Newspapers, and Patrick Elias QC and Nigel Giffin acted for Associated British Ports, while John Hendy QC and Jennifer Eady acted for Mr Wilson and Jeffrey Burke QC and Peter Clark acted for Mr Palmer.

European Court of Human Rights
The European Court of Human Rights held that the effect of UK law was to allow employers to treat employees that were unprepared to renounce the right to consult a union less favourably. The use of financial incentives to induce employees to surrender union rights violated ECHR article 11, since it effectively frustrated the union's ability to strive for protection of its members. Unions have the right to make representations to employers and ultimately take action to protect their interests.

Significance
Having been found to stand in breach of international labour law standards in general, and ECHR art 11 in particular, the UK government set about consulting on how to amend TULRCA 1992 to comply with the judgment, but with the objective of changing the law no further than absolutely necessary to comply with the ruling. The result was the Employment Relations Act 2004, which changed, in particular, TULRCA 1992 section 146 to stipulate that all "workers" were protected by the provisions on detriment for union membership and activities.

See also
Demir and Baykara v Turkey [2008] ECHR 1345

Notes

References
KD Ewing, 'The Implications of Wilson and Palmer' (2003) 32(1) Industrial Law Journal 1–22
E McGaughey, A Casebook on Labour Law (Hart 2018) ch 8, 354

External links
ECtHR judgment

United Kingdom labour case law
Article 11 of the European Convention on Human Rights
European Court of Human Rights cases involving the United Kingdom
Trade union case law
2002 in case law
2002 in British law
European Union labour law